Bar Harbor may refer to:

 Bar Harbor, Maine, a town in the United States
 Bar Harbor (CDP), Maine, a census-designated place within the town of Bar Harbor
 Bar Harbor Airlines, a former commuter airline based in Bar Harbor, Maine

See also

 Bal Harbour